The 2000–01 season was the 72nd season in the history of A.C. ChievoVerona and the club's seventh consecutive season in the second division of Italian football. In addition to the domestic league, ChievoVerona participated in this season's edition of the Coppa Italia.

Players

First-team squad

Pre-season and friendlies

Competitions

Overall record

Serie B

League table

Results summary

Results by round

Matches

Coppa Italia

References

A.C. ChievoVerona seasons
Chievo